Ong is a Hokkien romanization of several Chinese surnames:  (Wáng in Hanyu Pinyin),  (also Wāng),  (traditional) or  (simplified; Huáng); and  (Weng). Ong or Onge is also a surname of English origin, with earliest known records found in Western Suffolk taxation records from c. 1280 AD.  Ong (or Онгь in Russian language-based records) is also an Estonian surname, possibly derived from õng, meaning "fishing rod/hook".

Romanization
Under the Pe̍h-ōe-jī romanization system, 王 but not the other names includes a circumflex over its vowel: Ông. However, this is often omitted in practice.

Distribution
In Singapore, Ong is the fifth-most-common surname among Chinese residents. In the United States, Ong was the 6,682nd most common surname during the 1990 US census and the 4,343rd most common surname during the year 2000 US census.

Notable Ongs
 Angelia Ong, Filipina model and Miss Earth 2015
 Augustine Ong, Malaysian scientist, chairman of the International Society for Fat Research (ISF)
 Ong Beng Hee (b. 1980), Malaysian professional squash player
 Ong Beng Teong, Malaysian badminton player and coach
 Betty Ong (1956–2001), Chinese-American flight attendant on American Airlines Flight 11, killed in the September 11 attacks
 Ong Boon Hua, birth name of Chin Peng, Malaysian Communist Party leader
 Canny Ong, full name Canny Ong Lay Kian, Malaysian murder and rape victim
 Daniel Ong, Singaporean radio DJ
 Daryl Ong (born 1987), Filipino singer-songwriter
 Ong Ewe Hock, Malaysian badminton player
 Glenn Ong (b. 1970), Singaporean radio DJ
 Han Ong (b. 1968), Filipino author
 Ong Hock Thye, a Malaysian judge on the Courts of Malaysia.
 Ong Hok Ham (b. 1933), Indonesian-Chinese historian
 Ong Iok-tek (1924–1985), Taiwanese scholar and politician
 John D. Ong (b. 1933), American businessman; CEO, B.F. Goodrich Company 1979–1996, and U.S. Ambassador to Norway 2002–2006.
 Ong Ka Ting (b. 1956), Malaysian politician
 Ong Kee Hui, Chinese-Malaysian politician
 Ong Keng Sen (b. 1963), Singaporean theatre director
 Ong Keng Yong (b. 1954), Singaporean diplomat
 Ong Keo (before 1901–1937), Laotian pro-independence rebel
 Ong Kham, king of Luang Prabang (1713–1723)
 Ong Khan or Wang Khan (d. 1203), name given to the Kerait ruler Toghrul
 Ong Kommandam (d. 1936), Laotian pro-independence rebel
 Nai Phuan Ong (b. 1948), American physicist
 Olivia Ong, Singaporean singer
 Ong Pang Boon, Singaporean politician
 Ong Poh Lim, Malaysian badminton player
 Remy Ong (b. 1978), Singaporean bowler
 Richard Ong, Malaysian business man, CEO of Hopu Fund
 Ryan Ong Palao, Filipino-American drag performer and HIV awareness activist
 Samuel Ong, former deputy director of the National Bureau of Investigation (NBI) of the Philippines
 Willie Ong, (b. 1963) Filipino cardiologist, media personality and politician 
 Ong Schan Tchow (1900–1945), well-known Chinese patriot artist
 Ong Seok Kim (Wang Shujin) (1884–1964) – Malaysian educationist, social worker and philanthropist
 Ong Seong-wu, Korean singer and actor, also member of the famous South Korean boy band Wanna One (use Chinese character 邕)
 Ong Soh Khim, Singaporean academic and politician
 Ong Soo Hin, Malaysian Chinese businessman and head of a salvaging company in south-east Asia
 Ong Soon Hock, badminton player from Malaysia
 Ong Teck Chin, Singaporean educator
 Ong Teng Cheong (1936–2002), first elected President of Singapore
 Ong Tiao Kok, better known as Wang Zhaoguo, a Fujian Chinese politician who came to prominence during the era of Deng Xiaoping
 Walter J. Ong (1912–2003), American Jesuit priest, professor of English literature, cultural and religious historian and philosopher
 Ong Ye Kung (b. 1969), Singaporean Minister of Health
 Stilwell Ong Keat Pin (王吉宾；Wáng Jíbīn) (c. 1992–), a Singaporean who killed 19-year-old Darren Ng Wei Jie during a gang fight. He was jailed for 12 years and received 12 strokes of the cane for culpable homicide.
 Mat Ong (UK), International Concert Promoter

References

Hokkien-language surnames